Craig Warren Smith (born June 20, 1946 near Seattle) is an academic specializing in Human–computer interaction. He is chairman of a nonprofit organization, Digital Divide Institute, which is currently active in Indonesia, China, and Thailand.  
 
He is a former lecturer on Science and Technology at Harvard University (Kennedy School of Government). He holds concurrent academic advisory positions in China (Peking University) and Thailand (Chulalongkorn University) as well as the University of Washington (Human Interface Technology Laboratory) in Seattle.

Early life and education

Smith was raised in Whidbey Island, Washington. He attended Stanford University.

Work on corporate philanthropy

Smith worked in the Washington DC-based trade association, Council on Foundations, where he became a frequent writer for the trade journal, Foundation News.  He co-authored Private Foreign Aid: The Private Role in International Development and Getting Grants, published by Harper and Row. Dissatisfied with the quality of current practice regarding the philanthropic role of corporations, Smith founded his own publishing company called Corporate Philanthropy Report.  Smith wrote an article in Harvard Business Review, called "The New Corporate Philanthropy," published in 2004. The article explained the optimal role that could be played by philanthropy in the management structures of Fortune 500 companies.  Meanwhile, Japanese corporations turned to Smith to introduce philanthropy to Japanese corporations which had a Japanese version published by Dentsu Inc. Smith authored several books on Japanese corporate philanthropy, and traveled frequently travelled to Japan as a consultant where he helped companies such as Hitachi and Toyota create their own foundations.
 
As a Seattle-based expert in corporate philanthropy, Smith advised many of Seattle’s civic leaders including the father and mother of Bill Gates III (co-founder of Microsoft), who were both influential civic leaders and advocates of philanthropy, who introduced Smith to their son. After reading his article in Harvard Business Review, the Microsoft CEO invited Smith to serve as an in house consultant to assist the company's "community relations" activity. A business trade group, the Conference Board, asked Smith to head a new program in CSR Strategy offered to all major US corporations.

Digital Divide

Smith wrote a book Digital Corporate Citizenship (University of Indiana Press), which described efforts by 54 high tech companies – from IBM to Google—to alter their management structures with the aim of “closing Digital Divide.”  In 1999 Smith joined with Bill Gates Sr, to lead a Seattle conference held on the day prior to World Trade Organization’s conference. After the conference, Smith moved from Seattle to Cambridge Massachusetts to lead an interdisciplinary coalition focused on closing digital divide. In Cambridge, his framework was incorporated into DigitalDivide.org. After serving as a fellow of Harvard's Fairbank Center for China Studies, Smith was also invited many times to China to advise the Chinese government on its plan to extend broadband technology to its impoverished Western provinces. Smith lectured at several China-funded government forums, which resulting in his being invited to establish a three-year program on digital divide at the Department of Information Management of Peking University, China's top ranked university.

Smith was invited to teach science and technology policy in Singapore's Lee Kuan Yew School of Public Policy at National University of Singapore.  In Asia, Smith developed a decade-long partnership with Ilham A Habibie the son of a former President of Republic of Indonesia, whose father was the science and technology minister for 15 years. With Habibie's support, Smith gained political traction and funding needed to formulate the model of "Meaningful Broadband." Incorporating a technical team from The World Bank, Smith wrote a number of reports that produced a road map for the implementation of Meaningful Broadband  as a "bottom up" approach to socio-economic, cultural and environmental development in Indonesian regions.

Mindful Technologies

Since 1996,  when he was a founding faculty member of Naropa University,  Smith had maintained a parallel voluntary career as a mindfulness instructor in  affiliates of Shambhala International,  founded by Chogyam Trungpa Rinpoche. Smith introduced the theme of "spiritual computing" at University of Washington, Microsoft, IBM Labs and Google in 2006, when he became Senior Adviser to the Human Interface Technology Laboratory/

Books and major reports

 The Second Wireless Revolution: Bringing Broadband to the "Next Two Billion" in Asia's Emerging Markets, by Craig W Smith, published by University of Washington (Oct 11, 2011)
 Meaningful broadband for Indonesia: A strategic tool for national development published on Indonesian Strategic Review, 2012.
 "Harvard Business Review on Corporate Responsibility", edited series with Craig Warren Smith, 2003. 
 "The New Corporate Philanthropy", Harvard Business Review, by Craig Smith, 2004.
 Digital Corporate Citizenship,  by Craig Warren Smith, Indiana University Press, 2003. 
 Giving by Industry: An Industry-by-Industry Guide to Corporate Philanthropy, by Craig Warren Smith, Corporate Philanthropy Report, 1996. 
 "The New Corporate Philanthropy", by Craig Warren Smith, Harvard Business Review, June 1994.
 Japanese Corporate Philanthropy, by Craig Warren Smith, Corporate Philanthropy Report, 1993.
 Private Foreign Aid: United States Philanthropy in Relief and Development, by  R. Bolling & Smith, Craig. W. (May 30, 1982) 
 Getting Grants, by Craig Smith and Erik Skjei,  Harper and Row, 1980.

References

External links
 "Spiritual Computing - Microsoft Research" video on Microsoft Website
 "Digital Divide Institute"
 "HITLab University of Washington"
 Centre for Ethics of Science and Technology, Chulalongkorn University, Thailand
 Harvard University International Technologies Group

1946 births
Living people
Brandeis University alumni
Corporate social responsibility
Mindfulness (Buddhism)
Stanford University alumni
University of California alumni